Agaronia is a genus of sea snails, marine gastropod mollusks in the family Olividae.

Species
Species within the genus Agaronia include:
 Agaronia acuminata (Lamarck, 1811)
 Agaronia adamii Terzer, 1992
 † Agaronia almaghribensis Pacaud, 2019 
 Agaronia ancillarioides (Reeve, 1850)
 Agaronia annotata (Marrat, 1871)
 Agaronia biraghii Bernard & Nicolay, 1984
 Agaronia gibbosa (Born, 1778)
 Agaronia griseoalba (E. von Martens, 1897)
 Agaronia hiatula (Gmelin, 1791)
 Agaronia hilli Petuch, 1987
 † Agaronia ispidula (Linnaeus, 1758)
 Agaronia java S. K. Tan, H. E. Ng, S. Y. Chan & L. H. S. Nguang, 2019
 Agaronia jesuitarum Lopez, Montonya, Lopez, 1988
 Agaronia johnabbasi Celia, 2012 
 Agaronia johnkochi Voskuil, 1990
 Agaronia junior (Duclos, 1840)
 Agaronia leonardhilli Petuch, 1987
 Agaronia lutaria (Röding, 1798)
 Agaronia nica Lopez, Montonya, Lopez, 1988
 Agaronia plicaria Lamarc, 1811
 Agaronia propatula (Conrad, 1849)
 Agaronia razetoi Terzer, 1992
 Agaronia steeriae (Reeve, 1850)
 Agaronia testacea (Lamarck, 1811)
 Agaronia travassosi Lange de Morretes, 1938
Species brought into synonymy
 Agaronia johnabbasi Cilia, 2012: synonym of Agaronia johnkochi Voskuil, 1990
 Agaronia nebulosa (Lamarck, 1811): synonym of Agaronia gibbosa (Born, 1778)
 Agaronia plicaria (Lamarck, 1811) †: synonym of Agaronia ispidula (Linnaeus, 1758) †

References

 Bernard, P.A. (Ed.) (1984). Coquillages du Gabon [Shells of Gabon]. Pierre A. Bernard: Libreville, Gabon. 140, 75 plates pp

External links
 Gray, J.E.; Sowerby I.G.B. (1839). Molluscous animals and their shells. Pp. 103-155, pls 33-34 [pp. 103-142 by J. E. Gray, 143-155 by G. B. Sowerby I. In: The zoology of Capt. Beechey's voyage, compiled from the collections on notes made by Captain Beechey, the officers and naturalist of the expedition during a voyage to the Pacific and Behring's straits in his Majesty's ship Blossom, under the command of Captain F. W. Beechey in the years 1825, 26, 27 and 28. London pp. XII + 186 + 44 pl]

Olividae
Gastropod genera